The 2020–21 season was the 6th season in the existence of Patriots BBC, and its 1st in the Basketball Africa League (BAL) and began its season May 16, 2021. The team played in the NBL Rwanda and began its season on June 4, 2021, and ended on October 30, 2021.

The Patriots finished in the fourth place in the inaugural BAL season and were runners-up of their national league.

Roster

Team

Additions

|}

BAL

Group phase

|- style="background:#cfc;"
| 1
| 16 May
| Rivers Hoopers
| W 83–60
| Brandon Costner  (20)
| Prince Ibeh (11)
| Kenny Gasana (4)
| Kigali Arena2,000
| 1–0
|- style="background:#fcc;"
| 2
| 19 May
| GNBC
| W 72–78
| Brandon Costner (16)
| Tom Wamukota (11)
| Kenny Gasana (4)
| Kigali Arena1,022
| 2–0
|- style="background:#cfc;"
| 3
| 22 May
| US Monastir
| L 75–91
| Kenny Gasana (22)
| Brandon Costner (6)
| Kenny Gasana (8)
| Kigali Arena1,141
| 1–2

Playoffs

|- style="background:#cfc;"
| Quarterfinals
| 27 May
| Ferroviário de Maputo
| W 73–71
| Kenny Gasana  (23)
| Three players (5)
| Brandon Costner (5)
| Kigali Arena1,704
| N/A
|- style="background:#fcc;"
| Semifinals
| 29 May
| US Monastir
| L 87–46
| Dieudonné Ndizeye (13)
| Tom Wamukota (10)
| Five players (2)
| Kigali ArenaN/A
| N/A
|- style="background:#fcc;"
| Third place
| 30 May
| Petro de Luanda
| L 97–68
| Kenny Gasana (18)
| Dieudonné Ndizeye (8)
| Gasana, Sagamba (3)
| Kigali Arena747
| N/A

Statistics

Source:

NBL Rwanda
The following were the Patriots' games in the 2020–21 NBL Rwanda.

|-
!colspan=12 style=""|Regular Season

|-
!colspan=12 style=""|Quarterfinals
|-

|-
!colspan=12 style=""|Semifinals
|-

|-
!colspan=12 style=""|Finals
|-

|}

References

Patriots BBC